The Vanuatu national rugby sevens team is Vanuatu's representative in rugby sevens.

History

At the 1999 South Pacific Games held in Guam, Vanuatu won its second rugby medal, defeating Solomon Islands for the bronze in the rugby 7s. The first bronze medal had been won for the rugby 15's in 1966, as New Hebrides.

In the 2000 Telecom Oceania Sevens held in Rarotonga, Vanuatu went on to beat Tahiti 31–0 to win the Bowl. The tournament was a qualifier for the 2001 Rugby World Cup Sevens and the last World Cup place was taken by the Cook Islands, who won the Oceania Sevens Cup.

At the 2011 Pacific Games, Vanuatu finished in 9th place, defeating Tahiti 7–17.

Squad
Squad to 2015 Pacific Games:
Koko Kalsal
George Kalpausi Sablan
Akuila Ita Kalsakau
Jeffrey Saurei
Antoine Sablan
Waute Chichirua
Taputu Kalpukai
Steven Jacob Shem
Claude Raymond
Omari Kalmet Bakokoto
Malau Tevita Tai
Graham Malon Tungan

Previous Squads

See also

 Rugby union in Vanuatu
 Vanuatu national rugby union team

References

National rugby sevens teams
Rugby union in Vanuatu
National sports teams of Vanuatu